Ciarda Roșie Stadium is a multi-purpose stadium in Timișoara, Romania. Until 2015 the stadium was named Tehnomet, when it was taken over by Ripensia Timișoara and renamed Ciarda Roșie, after the district where it is located. It is used mostly for football matches and was the home ground of Ripensia Timișoara from 2015 to 2019. Since the 2019–2020 season, it hosts Ripensia's U19 and U17 teams. The stadium has 1,000 seats.

References 

Football venues in Romania
Buildings and structures in Timișoara
Sport in Timișoara